A shibboleth is any custom or tradition, usually a choice of phrasing or even a single word, that distinguishes one group of people from another. Shibboleths have been used throughout history in many societies as passwords, simple ways of self-identification, signaling loyalty and affinity, maintaining traditional segregation, or protecting from real or perceived threats.

Origin
The term originates from the Hebrew word , which means the part of a plant containing grain, such as the head of a stalk of wheat or rye; or less commonly (but arguably more appropriately) "flood, torrent".

The modern use derives from an account in the Hebrew Bible, in which pronunciation of this word was used to distinguish Ephraimites, whose dialect used a differently sounding first consonant. In the Book of Judges, chapter 12, after the inhabitants of Gilead under the command of Jephthah inflicted a military defeat upon the invading tribe of Ephraim (around 1370–1070 BC), the surviving Ephraimites tried to cross the River Jordan back into their home territory, but the Gileadites secured the river's fords to stop them. To identify and kill these Ephraimites, the Gileadites told each suspected survivor to say the word shibboleth. The Ephraimite dialect resulted in a pronunciation that, to Gileadites, sounded like sibboleth. In Judges 12:5–6 in the King James Bible, the anecdote appears thus (with the word already in its current English spelling):

Modern use
In modern English, a shibboleth can have a sociological meaning, referring to any in-group word or phrase that can distinguish members from outsiders. It is also sometimes used in a broader sense to mean jargon, the proper use of which identifies speakers as members of a particular group or subculture.

In information technology, a shibboleth is a community-wide password that enables members of that community to access an online resource without revealing their individual identities. The origin server can vouch for the identity of the individual user without giving the target server any further identifying information. Hence the individual user does not know the password that is actually employed – it is generated internally by the origin server – and so cannot betray it to outsiders.

The term can also be used pejoratively, suggesting that the original meaning of a symbol has in effect been lost and that the symbol now serves merely to identify allegiance, being described as "nothing more than a shibboleth". In 1956, Nobel Prize-laureate economist Paul Samuelson applied the term "shibboleth" in works including Foundations of Economic Analysis to an idea for which "the means becomes the end, and the letter of the law takes precedence over the spirit." Samuelson admitted that "shibboleth" is an imperfect term for this phenomenon.

Examples

Shibboleths have been used by different subcultures throughout the world at different times.  Regional differences, level of expertise, and computer coding techniques are several forms that shibboleths have taken.

They identified Frenchmen based on their inability to pronounce the Flemish phrase  (shield and friend), or possibly  (friend of the Guilds). However, many Medieval Flemish dialects did not contain the cluster sch- either (even today's Kortrijk dialect has sk-), and Medieval French rolled the r just as Flemish did.

There is an anecdote in Sicily that, during the rebellion of the Sicilian Vespers in 1282, the inhabitants of the island killed the French occupiers who, when questioned, could not correctly pronounce the Sicilian word  ("chickpeas").

 ("Butter, rye bread and green cheese, whoever cannot say that is not a genuine Frisian") was a phrase used by the Frisian Pier Gerlofs Donia during a Frisian rebellion (1515–1523). Ships whose crew could not pronounce this properly were usually plundered and soldiers who could not were beheaded by Donia himself.

On that date in 1794, people in Cagliari chased suspected officers of the ruling Piedmontese king and asked them to say  (Sardinian for 'chickpea'), which the Piedmontese could not pronounce. Some 514 officers were thus identified and sent back to the mainland.

In October 1937, the Spanish word for parsley, was used as a shibboleth to identify Haitian immigrants living along the border in the Dominican Republic. Dominican dictator, Rafael Trujillo, ordered the execution of these people. It is alleged that between 20,000 and 30,000 individuals were murdered within a few days in the Parsley Massacre, although more recent scholarship and the lack of evidence such as mass graves puts the actual estimate closer to between 1,000 and 12,168.

During the German occupation of the Netherlands in World War II, the Dutch used the name of the seaside town of Scheveningen as a shibboleth to tell Germans from Dutch ("Sch" in Dutch is analyzed as the letter "s" combined with the digraph "ch", producing the consonant cluster , while in German "Sch" is read as the trigraph "sch", pronounced , closer to "sh" sound in English).

Some United States soldiers in the Pacific theater in World War II used the word lollapalooza as a shibboleth to challenge unidentified persons, on the premise that Japanese people would often pronounce both letters L and R as rolled Rs. In Oliver Gramling's Free Men are Fighting: The Story of World War II (1942) the author notes that, in the war, Japanese spies would often approach checkpoints posing as American or Filipino military personnel. A shibboleth such as "lollapalooza" would be used by the sentry, who, if the first two syllables come back as rorra, would "open fire without waiting to hear the remainder".

During The Troubles in Northern Ireland, use of the name Derry or Londonderry for the province's second-largest city was often taken as an indication of the speaker's political stance, and as such frequently implied more than simply naming the location. The pronunciation of the name of the letter H is a related shibboleth, with Catholics pronouncing it as "haitch" and Protestants often pronouncing the letter differently.

During the Black July riots of Sri Lanka in 1983, many Tamils were massacred by Sinhalese youths. In many cases these massacres took the form of boarding buses and getting the passengers to pronounce words that had hard ⟨ba⟩'s at the start of the word (like  – bucket) and executing the people who found it difficult.

In Australia and New Zealand, the words "fish and chips" are often used to highlight the difference in each country's short-i vowel sound [ɪ] and asking someone to say the phrase can identify which country they are from. Australian English has a higher forward sound [i], close to the y in happy and city, while New Zealand English has a lower backward sound [ɘ], a slightly higher version of the a in about and comma. Thus, New Zealanders hear Australians say "feesh and cheeps", while Australians hear New Zealanders say "fush and chups". A long drawn out pronunciation of the names of the cities Brisbane and Melbourne rather than the typically Australian rapid "bun" ending is a common way for someone to be exposed as new to the country. Within Australia, what someone calls "devon", or how they name the size of beer they order can often pinpoint what state they are from, as both of these have varied names across the country.

In the United States, the name of the state "Nevada" comes from the Spanish  , meaning "snow-covered". Nevadans pronounce the second syllable with the "a" as in "trap" while some people from outside of the state can pronounce it with the "a" as in "palm". Although many Americans interpret the latter back vowel as being closer to the Spanish pronunciation, it is not the pronunciation used by Nevadans. Likewise, the same test can be used to identify someone unfamiliar with southwest Missouri, as Nevada, Missouri is pronounced with the "a" as in "cape".

In the United States, in the state of New Jersey, the choice of term for a regional type of cured pork product can identify whether the speaker hails from the northern or southern part of the state. "Pork roll" is widely used in the southern portion of the state, while "taylor ham" is used in the north.

During the Russo-Ukrainian War (2014–), Ukrainians used the word  (a type of Ukrainian bread) to distinguish between Ukrainians and Russians.

In New York City, how one pronounces the name of Houston Street in Manhattan is a common differentiatior between tourists and those who actually live in the city, as tourists tend to pronounce it similarly to the name of the city in Texas. The correct New York pronunciation is HOW-stun.

Furtive shibboleths
A "furtive shibboleth" is a type of a shibboleth that identifies individuals as being part of a group, not based on their ability to pronounce one or more words, but on their ability to recognize a seemingly innocuous phrase as a secret message. For example, members of Alcoholics Anonymous sometimes refer to themselves as "a friend of Bill W.", which is a reference to AA's founder, William Griffith Wilson. To the uninitiated, this would seem like a casual – if off-topic – remark, but other AA members would understand its meaning.

Similarly, during World War II, a homosexual US sailor might call himself a "friend of Dorothy", a tongue-in-cheek acknowledgment of a stereotypical affinity for Judy Garland in The Wizard of Oz. This code was so effective that the Naval Investigative Service, upon learning that the phrase was a way for gay sailors to identify each other, undertook a search for this "Dorothy", whom they believed to be an actual woman with connections to homosexual servicemen in the Chicago area.

Likewise, homosexuals in Britain might use the cant language Polari.

Mark Twain used an explicit shibboleth to conceal a furtive shibboleth.  In The Innocents Abroad he told the Shibboleth story in seemingly "inept and uninteresting" detail. To the initiated, however, the wording revealed that Twain was a freemason.

"Fourteen Words", "14", or "14/88" are furtive shibboleths used among white supremacists in the Anglosphere.

In art

Colombian conceptual artist Doris Salcedo created a work titled Shibboleth at Tate Modern, London, in 2007–2008. The piece consisted of a 548-foot-long crack that bisected the floor of the Tate's lobby space.

Salcedo said of the work:

In fiction
In an episode of The West Wing titled "Shibboleth", President Bartlet discusses the meaning of the word at length. His advisors believe it is a catch phrase or cliche, after which Bartlet reminds them of its earlier biblical significance. He later becomes certain that a group of Chinese religious asylum seekers are indeed Christian when their representative uses the word to refer to his faith during a meeting.

In an episode of Seinfeld titled "The Van Buren Boys", Kramer unintentionally makes the eponymous street gang's shibboleth, eight outstretched fingers signifying the eighth US president, Martin Van Buren.

In  the movie Inglourious Basterds, the Basterds give themselves away by holding up the 'wrong' three fingers to order three glasses of scotch. In Western Europe the thumb,  index and middle fingers are used; the British officer used the index, middle and ring fingers in the traditional manner used in English-speaking countries.

In an episode of Law & Order: Criminal Intent ("Shibboleth", Episode 4.17) a killer gives himself away by his particular pronunciation of a word.

In the fantasy short story "The Shadow Kingdom" by Robert E. Howard, the evil Serpent Men use sorcery to disguise themselves as human beings. The spoken phrase "Ka nama kaa lajerama" may be used as a shibboleth to reveal their true nature, since the construction of a Serpent Man's mouth and jaws makes it unable to speak the phrase.

In the eleventh chapter of The Peoples of Middle-earth, edited by Christopher Tolkien, after their exile, Fëanor and his followers made the rejection of the Quenya linguistic shift from þ to s a political shibboleth, with Fëanor himself being written to say: "We speak as is right, and as King Finwë himself did before he was led astray. We are his heirs by right and the elder house. Let them sá-sí, if they can speak no better." 
  
In the 1998 film Ronin, Robert De Niro's character confronts Sean Bean's character, whom he suspects to be lying about his experience in the SAS, by asking him "What's the colour of the boat house at Hereford?", pronouncing it /'hiːrfərd/. A true member of the SAS would point out that Hereford (where the SAS headquarters was located at the time) is pronounced /ˈhɛrɪfərd/. The "colour of the boat house" was a red herring, as evidenced in later dialogue.

In the 2010 action role-playing game Fallout: New Vegas, supporters of the Caesar's Legion faction can be identified by their pronunciation of "Caesar" in the Classical manner: /'kaɪzɑːr/

In Isaac Asimov's 1985 novel Robots and Empire, an abandoned planet is discovered to contain robots which, while following the Three Laws of Robotics, are programmed to only consider people speaking with the local accent as human, and are instructed to eliminate anyone whose pronunciation differs.

See also

References

Notes

Citations

Further reading

 
Authentication methods
Gilead
Hebrew words and phrases in the Hebrew Bible
Ethnic cleansing